North Carolina's 49th Senate district is one of 50 districts in the North Carolina Senate. It has been represented by Democrat Julie Mayfield since 2021.

Geography
Since 2003, the district has covered most of Buncombe County. The district overlaps with the 114th, 115th, and 116th state house districts.

District officeholders since 2003

Election results

2022

2020

2018

2016

2014

2012

2010

2008

2006

2004

2002

References

North Carolina Senate districts
Buncombe County, North Carolina